Chumurkone is a village in the Chitral District of Pakistan.

History 
The history of Chumurkone goes back 2000 years in history when Chinese ruled this place.

People 
Most of the population consists of Kho people but a small number of Gujat tribes also reside here.

Geography 
Orghoch village is located to the West, Jutilasht to the South, Bakarabad to the North, and the Chumurkone jungle to the East.

Towns 
 Dok
 Muldeh
 Tordeh
 Darisht
 Koh
 Gulshan Abad
 Barandeh
 Dovlat Shahi

Schools 
 Govt High School Chumurkone
 Hira Model High School Chumurkone
 Eastern Model School Chumurkone

Roads 
 Muldeh Road (Which Connects Dok With Muldeh)
 Darisht Road (Which Connect Muldeh With Darisht)
 Gulshan Abad Road (Which Connect Muldeh With Gulshan Abad)
 Dovlat Shahi road (Connects Muldeh And Dok With Dovlat Shahi

References 

Populated places in Chitral District
Villages in Pakistan